Goldiş is a Romanian surname. Notable people with the surname include:

Radu Goldiş (born 1947), Romanian-American jazz guitarist
Vasile Goldiș (1862–1934), Romanian politician and member of the Romanian Academy

See also
Vasile Goldiş, a village in Beliu Commune, Arad County, Romania.

Romanian-language surnames